The 2016 NCAA Division II women's basketball tournament involved 64 teams playing in a single-elimination tournament to determine the NCAA Division II women's college basketball national champion. It began on March 10, 2016, and concluded with the championship game on April 4, 2016.

The first three rounds were hosted by top-seeded teams in regional play. The eight regional winners met for the quarterfinal and semifinals, better known as the "Elite Eight" and "Final Four" respectively, championship rounds for the second-consecutive year at the Sanford Pentagon in Sioux Falls, South Dakota. The championship game, along with the championship game of the Division I and Division III tournaments, were held at Bankers Life Fieldhouse in Indianapolis, Indiana.

In their first season of NCAA postseason eligibility after transitioning from the NAIA, the Lubbock Christian Lady Chaps completed an undefeated season by defeating the Alaska Anchorage Seawolves 78–73. The only blemish in the Lady Chaps' season was a 95–39 exhibition loss to eventual Division I champion Connecticut that did not count toward either team's official record.

Participants

Automatic qualifiers
Twenty-four teams qualified for the tournament by winning their conference's automatic bid.

At-large
The remaining 40 bids to the tournament were given to teams at-large.

Regionals

Atlantic - Richmond, Virginia
Hosted by Virginia Union University at Arthur Ashe Athletic Center

Central - Pittsburg, Kansas
Hosted by Pittsburg State University at John Lance Arena

East - Waltham, Massachusetts
Hosted by Bentley University at Dana Center

Midwest - Ashland, Ohio
Hosted by Ashland University at Kates Gymnasium

South - Jackson, Tennessee
Hosted by Union University at Fred DeLay Gymnasium

Southeast - Gaffney, South Carolina
Hosted by Limestone College at Timken Center

South Central - Lubbock, Texas
Hosted by Lubbock Christian University at Rip Griffin Center

West - Azusa, California
Hosted by Azusa Pacific University at Felix Event Center

Elite Eight - Sioux Falls, South Dakota and Indianapolis, Indiana
Quarterfinals and semifinals location: Sanford Pentagon in Sioux Falls Host: Northern Sun Intercollegiate Conference

Championship game location: Bankers Life Fieldhouse in Indianapolis (along with the Division I and Division III championship games) Hosts: Horizon League and
IUPU-Indianapolis

See also
 2016 NCAA Division II women's basketball tournament
 2016 NCAA Division III women's basketball tournament
 2016 NCAA Division I men's basketball tournament
 2016 NCAA Division II men's basketball tournament
 2016 NCAA Division III men's basketball tournament
 2016 Women's National Invitation Tournament
 2016 National Invitation Tournament
 2016 NAIA Division I women's basketball tournament
 2016 NAIA Division II women's basketball tournament
 2016 NAIA Division I men's basketball tournament
 2016 NAIA Division II men's basketball tournament

References
 2016 NCAA Division II women's basketball tournament jonfmorse.com

External links
Official Website

NCAA Division II women's basketball tournament
NCAA tournament
Basketball competitions in Lubbock, Texas
Basketball competitions in Indianapolis
Women's sports in Indiana
College sports tournaments in Indiana